Minnick is a surname. Notable people with the surname include:

 John Harrison Minnick, (1877–1966), American educator
 Joseph J. Minnick (1933–2015), American politician
 Walt Minnick (born 1942), American politician

See also
 Minnich
 Minick (disambiguation)
 Minich
 Minik (disambiguation)